Alan Green  (29 September 1911 – 2 February 1991) was a British Conservative Party politician.

Green was educated at Brighton College and the University of London.  In 1935 he joined a Blackburn manufacturer as a manager, and became a company director and a member of a firm of textile engineers.  He volunteered for the British Army at the outbreak of World War II and was commissioned into the Royal Artillery in 1942, serving in the Middle East and attaining the rank of Major.

Green contested Nelson and Colne in 1950 and 1951. He was twice Member of Parliament for the marginal Preston South constituency, from the 1955 general election until he lost his seat at the 1964 election and again from the 1970 election until his second defeat at the February 1974. At the end of both terms he lost to the Labour candidate, on the latter occasion to Stanley Thorne.

Green was a junior government minister, serving as Parliamentary Secretary to the Ministry of Labour from 1961 to 1962, Parliamentary Secretary to the Board of Trade from 1962 to 1963, and Financial Secretary to the Treasury from 1963 to 1964.

References 
Times Guide to the House of Commons, 1955, 1966 and October 1974

External links 
 

1911 births
1991 deaths
Alumni of the University of London
British Army personnel of World War II
Commanders of the Order of the British Empire
Conservative Party (UK) MPs for English constituencies
Ministers in the Macmillan and Douglas-Home governments, 1957–1964
People educated at Brighton College
Royal Artillery officers
UK MPs 1955–1959
UK MPs 1959–1964
UK MPs 1970–1974